Alcor may refer to:

 Alcor (star), also known as 80 Ursae Majoris, a star in Ursa Major very close to Mizar
 Alcor Life Extension Foundation
 Alcor sailplane, a high altitude pressurized sailplane developed by aeronautical engineer Robert Lamson
 ALCOR, a programming language
 French name of the anime and manga hero Kouji Kabuto

See also
 USS Alcor